The Talkan and Curcan massacres were committed by the Umayyad Caliphate against Türgesh Turks as part of their Muslim conquest of Transoxiana, although much conversions to Islam didn't start until Abbasid Caliphate rule.

Background 
When the Umayyad governor Al-Hajjaj ibn Yusuf ordered Qutayba ibn Muslim with the Muslim conquest of Transoxiana in 705, the Arabs under the command of Qutayba bin Muslim started a jihad against Transoxiana. Qutayba bin Muslim's goal was to capture Transoxiana and Tokharistan.  Qutayba, who was a stern commander, embarked on a major military operation. He captured some cities in Lower Tokharistan and marched on Baykand, one of the largest and richest trade centers of the time, after a loss, and another struggle that lasted for about two months, the Arabs captured Baykand. The city was reported to have been looted and destroyed after they entered it. All the men who were capable of fighting were killed in the city. Women and children were captured and taken to various different places.

Qutayba was able to capture Samarkand only in 711. When he captured Samarkand, he had many religious places belonging to non-Islamic beliefs destroyed. Qutayba, who caused similar incidents in Khwarazm, again had educated people killed and books burned. The imams in charge were calling the new converts to prayer by going from house to house.

Talkan massacre 
This massacre is the largest of the two. In the city of Talkan, under the rule of the Türgesh Khagan Nizek Tarhan, the Arab army carried out an invasion, but winter approached, and the Arabs have never experienced a cold winter unlike the Turks. Although the Turks had a weather advantage, they had run out of food in Tarhan's castle. Qutayba sends a man named Muhammed ibn Selim to Tarhan. Muhammed ibn Selim assures Tarhan that if he surrenders, he will not be harmed in any way. Tarhan accepted. They surrendered their weapons and left the castle. In complete violation of their deal, Tarhan is captured as soon as he leaves the castle. Qutayba sends news to Hajjaj and asks what to do. Hajjaj said “He is an enemy to Muslims, kill him without any mercy”. Qutayba first kills Tarhan's two sons in front of him. He then cut off the heads of about 700 Turkic warriors in front of Tarhan and the public. He then kills Tarhan. Abdurrahman bin Muslim, Qutayba's brother, had come to Qutayba's throne with 4000 prisoners from the city. Qutayba ordered for one thousand of these prisoners to be placed by his right, one thousand by his left, one thousand behind him and one thousand in front of him. He then told his soldiers to behead each prisoner in order. All battle-aged men were also ordered to be killed, and all women made concubines. 40,000 people were killed in the Talkan massacre. On a 24 kilometer path which had trees on both sides, most of the men were hung from those trees. Islam later spread in the region and those who did not leave their religion were counted as "infidels". Qutayba sent one-fifth of the girls and women left behind from the massacre to be assigned to the caliph as concubines, the remainder was divided among the soldiers. He also had 80 leaders who had been taken prisoner and handcuffed on their hands and feet sent to Hajjaj as a gift. After the death of Qutayba in 715, the Islamic conquests in Talkan were briefly stopped.

Curcan massacre 
When the people of Curcan revolted and defeat the Arab soldiers. After a 7-month battle, Curcan falls. The leader and soldiers in the leader's castle are taken prisoner. Arabs then commit a massacre in the city of Curcan, with same policies as the one in Talkan. Thousands of prisoners were dragged to a nearby river. They were slaughtered until the river turned red from their blood. After all women remaining from the massacre were made into concubines for the commanders and caliph, the rest are shared among the soldiers. A bit less than 40,000 Turks were killed in the Curcan massacre as well.

Losses 
In total, over 100,000 Turkic peoples were massacred and more than 50,000 Turkic youth and women were made slaves and concubines. Cities were plundered, and all the valuables had been taken. Most "un-Islamic" monuments had been destroyed. Qutayba's soldiers reportedly chanted "Shariah knows no words" throughout the massacres.

References 

Islamization
Persecution of Turkic peoples